Natalia Romero (born 26 February 1980 in Talagante) is a Chilean long-distance runner. She competed in the marathon at the 2012 Summer Olympics, placing 69th with a time of 2:37:47.

References

1980 births
Living people
Chilean female long-distance runners
Olympic athletes of Chile
Athletes (track and field) at the 2012 Summer Olympics
Athletes (track and field) at the 2016 Summer Olympics
Pan American Games competitors for Chile
Athletes (track and field) at the 2015 Pan American Games
Chilean female marathon runners
People from Santiago Metropolitan Region